William H. Horne (born March 28, 1948) is a Canadian politician. He was elected to the Nova Scotia House of Assembly in the 2013 provincial election. A member of the Nova Scotia Liberal Party, he represented the electoral district of Waverley-Fall River-Beaver Bank.

Horne graduated from Saint Mary's University in 1972 with a Bachelor of Science.

Electoral record

|-

|Liberal
|Bill Horne
|align="right"|3,588
|align="right"|43.09
|align="right"|
|-

|Progressive Conservative
|Brian Wong
|align="right"|2,640
|align="right"|31.71
|align="right"|
|-

|New Democratic Party
|Percy Paris
|align="right"|2,098
|align="right"|25.02
|align="right"|

|}

|-

|New Democratic Party
|Percy Paris
|align="right"|5,007
|align="right"|54.47
|align="right"|
|-

|Liberal
|Bill Horne
|align="right"|2,290
|align="right"|24.91
|align="right"|
|-
 
|Progressive Conservative
|Gary Hines
|align="right"|1,696
|align="right"|18.45
|align="right"|
|-

|}

References

Living people
Nova Scotia Liberal Party MLAs
People from the Halifax Regional Municipality
21st-century Canadian politicians
Saint Mary's University (Halifax) alumni
1948 births